Bishop Joseph Brendan Whelan, C.S.Sp.(1909-1990), was an Irish Spiritan priest who served as Bishop of Owerri in Nigeria..

Early life and education
Born 25 May 1909 in St Michael's Parish, Limerick City, his secondary schooling was at Blackrock College in Dublin, joining the Holy Ghost Fathers, he studied at University College Dublin, where he took first place and was a scholarship winner in his BA. In 1934 he went to Rome to study Theology at the Gregorian University, earning an Honours Doctorate.

Episcopacy
Whelan served as Bishop of Owerri from 1950 to 1970 (during the Nigerian Civil War when he was imprisoned prior to being deported), before Owerri was elevated to a diocese, he was appointed in 1948 as Vicar Apostolic of Owerri.

Later life
Following his deportation from Nigeria, he worked at Duquesne University, Pittsburgh, and returned to Kimmage Manor in 1971.

He died on 8 December 1990.

References

1909 births
1990 deaths
Clergy from County Limerick
Alumni of University College Dublin
Holy Ghost Fathers
Irish Spiritans
Roman Catholic missionaries in Nigeria
20th-century Roman Catholic bishops in Nigeria
Irish expatriate Catholic bishops
People educated at Blackrock College
20th-century Irish Roman Catholic priests
Roman Catholic bishops of Owerri